1,2-Butadiene is the organic compound with the formula CH2=C=CHCH3.  It is an isomer of 1,3-butadiene, a common monomer used to make synthetic rubber.  It is a colorless flammable gas, one of the simplest substituted allenes.

Production
The C4-fraction obtained by cracking and separated by distillation consists of many compounds, predominantly (75%) 1,3-butadiene, isobutene, 1-butene. 1,2-Butadiene comprises less than 1% or this mixture.  It is partially purified by extraction with N-methylpyrrolidone.  US product is 5,000 -25,000 tons.

References

Alkadienes